Emperor Ai of Jin (341 – March 30, 365), personal name Sima Pi, courtesy name Qianling, was an emperor of the Eastern Jin Dynasty.  During his brief reign, the actual powers were largely in the hands of his granduncle Sima Yu the Prince of Kuaiji, and the paramount general Huan Wen.  According to historical accounts, he had an obsession with immortality, which resulted in his death, brought about as a result of poisoning by pills given to him by magicians in 364 and in 365.

Early life
Sima Pi was born in 341, during the reign of his father Emperor Cheng of Jin, as Emperor Cheng's oldest son.  His mother was Consort Zhou, who in 342 gave birth to his younger brother Sima Yi.  In summer 342, Emperor Cheng grew ill.  The common succession protocol, as He Chong (何充) pointed out, would mean that his oldest son would succeed to the throne, but Emperor Cheng's uncle Yu Bing (庾冰), wanting a new emperor who would also be connected to his clan as well, persuaded Emperor Cheng to pass the throne to his younger brother Sima Yue the Prince of Langya, also a son of his sister Yu Wenjun, under the reasoning that with the powerful rival Later Zhao to the north, the empire needed an adult emperor.  Emperor Cheng agreed, and named Sima Yue as the heir, and Sima Yue succeeded to the throne as Emperor Kang when he died soon after.  The one-year-old Sima Pi was instead created the Prince of Langya on 1 August 342.  He continued in that title after Emperor Kang's death in November 344, as Emperor Kang chose to pass the throne to his infant son Sima Dan (as Emperor Mu).  It is not known when he married his wife Wang Muzhi, only that she carried the title Princess Consort of Langya.

Reign

In July 361, Emperor Mu died without a son.  Emperor Mu's mother Empress Dowager Chu thus ordered that Sima Pi be made emperor, and he took the throne as Emperor Ai, at age 20.  He created his wife Princess Consort Wang as empress in October 361, and his brother Sima Yi, who previously carried the title the Prince of Donghai, as the Prince of Langya.  Since he was an adult, Empress Dowager Chu did not serve as regent for him, and he honored his mother Consort Zhou as Consort Dowager in 362, but with supplies and ceremonies similar to the empress dowager.  However, the decision-making process was largely in the hands of the general Huan Wen and Emperor Ai's granduncle Sima Yu the Prince of Kuaiji.

In 362, Huan, after securing the Luoyang region, requested that the capital be moved back to Luoyang, where it had been until it was captured by Han Zhao in 311.  The imperial government, under an edict issued by Emperor Ai, declined.

In 363, Consort Dowager Zhou died.  In accordance with proper protocol that he could no longer honor her as mother, out of respect for Empress Dowgaer Chu, Emperor Ai did not observe the normal mourning period due a mother.

Emperor Ai was obsessed with seeking immortality, and despite his young age, he died from Chinese alchemical elixir poisoning.  In 364, he became poisoned by pills given him by magicians, and he grew so ill that he was unable to handle important matters.  Empress Dowager Chu had to resume regency on his behalf.

Later in 364, Former Yan launched a major attack against Luoyang, and Huan and Sima Yu considered a counterattack to relieve Luoyang.  However, as Emperor Ai died in March 365, that plan was cancelled, and Luoyang soon fell.  As he did not have a son, Emperor Ai was succeeded by his brother Sima Yi, as Emperor Fei.  (Emperor Ai was preceded in death by his wife Empress Wang, as she died about a month before he died; they were buried together with imperial honors.)

Era names
 Longhe (隆和, py. Lónghé): 2 March 362 – 20 March 363
 Xingning (興寧, py. Xīngníng): 20 March 363 – 28 January 366

Family
Consorts and Issue:
 Empress Aijing, of the Wang clan of Taiyuan (d. 365), personal name Muzhi
 Unknown
 Unnamed son (b. 3 November 363) died young before his father

Ancestry

References

 Fang Xuanling inter al., eds. 晉書 (Book of Jin), 648. Beijing: Zhonghua Publishing, 1974. 10 vols.
  20 vols.

341 births
365 deaths
Jin dynasty (266–420) emperors
4th-century Chinese monarchs